Child Health and Environment Save Society Nepal (CHESS Nepal) is a not for profit and non governmental organization based in Besisahar, Lamjung District, Nepal, with offices also in Kathmandu and Pokhara.

It was established in 1998 and is currently focusing on western Nepal, addresses concerns on children's rights, health, education, environment, awareness raising, and income generation.

CHESS Nepal professes that they regard social mobilization as the key to community development and believe that the sustainability of future generations and children are the key to the future. The organization is affiliated with the Social Welfare Council under the Ministry of Women and Children. One of their notable projects is Coffee promotion in Nepal.

References

External links
Official site

Child-related organisations in Nepal
1998 establishments in Nepal